Thomas Zajac (born 22 September 1985) is an Austrian competitive sailor.

He competed at the 2016 Summer Olympics in Rio de Janeiro, in the mixed Nacra 17 where he won a bronze medal. Zajac was the flag bearer for Austria during the closing ceremonies along with Tanja Frank.

In 2021, in the 2020 Olympics, he competed partnered with Barbara Matz in the Nacra 17 event.

References

External links

 

1985 births
Living people
Austrian male sailors (sport)
Olympic sailors of Austria
Sailors at the 2016 Summer Olympics – Nacra 17
Olympic bronze medalists for Austria
Olympic medalists in sailing
Medalists at the 2016 Summer Olympics
Sailors at the 2020 Summer Olympics – Nacra 17